Pavel Ploc (born 15 June 1964) is a Czech former ski jumper who competed for Czechoslovakia, winning two Olympic medals.

Career
At the Winter Olympics, he earned a silver in the individual normal hill in 1988 and a bronze in the individual large hill in 1984. Ploc also earned two bronze medals in the Team large hill event at the FIS Nordic World Ski Championships (1984, 1989). He also won two medals at the FIS Ski Flying World Championships with a silver in 1983 and a bronze in 1985.

Ploc finished his active ski jumping career in 1992 and in 1996 opened Bed&Breakfast in Harrachov, Czech Republic. From 1996 to 2002 he was an elected member of the Harrachov town council. He unsuccessfully run for a seat in the Czech Parliament in 2002 but won that seat in 2006 and became a member of the lower chamber of the Czech Parliament for the Czech Social Democratic Party (ČSSD).

On 19 March 1983, at the 7th Ski Flying World Championships, he tied the ski jumping world record distance at 181 metres (594 ft) on Čerťák in Harrachov, Czechoslovakia.

World Cup

Standings

Wins

Ski jumping world record

References

External links
  (under CZE nationality)
 
 

1964 births
Czech businesspeople
Czechoslovak male ski jumpers
Czech male ski jumpers
Sports world record setters
Living people
Olympic ski jumpers of Czechoslovakia
Olympic silver medalists for Czechoslovakia
Olympic bronze medalists for Czechoslovakia
Ski jumpers at the 1984 Winter Olympics
Ski jumpers at the 1988 Winter Olympics
Czech Social Democratic Party MPs
Olympic medalists in ski jumping
FIS Nordic World Ski Championships medalists in ski jumping
Medalists at the 1984 Winter Olympics
Medalists at the 1988 Winter Olympics
Members of the Chamber of Deputies of the Czech Republic (2010–2013)
Members of the Chamber of Deputies of the Czech Republic (2006–2010)
Members of the Chamber of Deputies of the Czech Republic (2013–2017)